Brodin is a surname. Notable people with the surname include:

Ben Brodin, musician from Omaha, Nebraska
Claude Brodin (1934–2014), French Olympic fencer
Daniel Brodin (born 1990), Swedish ice hockey player
Elin Brodin (born 1963), Norwegian novelist
Gösta Brodin (1908–1979), Swedish sailor who competed in the 1948 Summer Olympics
Jacques Brodin (born 1946), French fencer
Jonas Brodin (born 1993), Swedish ice hockey player